Luis Carvallo was a Chilean footballer.

He was the first top scorer in Chilean first tier tournaments.

Honours

Club
 Campeonato Nacional (Chile) Top-Scorer: 1933

References

Year of birth missing
Year of death missing
Chilean Primera División players
Colo-Colo footballers
Association football forwards
Chilean footballers